Yang Hongji (born 8 February 1941) is a Chinese national-level actor and one of China's most outstanding baritones. He is also a professor at the People's Liberation Army Academy of Art. He holds the rank of Major General (Shaojiang).

Early life and education
Yang was born in Dalian, Fengtian province, Manchukuo, on February 8, 1941, while his ancestral home in Rongcheng, Shandong. After the founding of the Communist State in 1959, he was accepted to the Opera House of Dalian Song and Dance Troupe. In 1962 he entered the CPC Central Military Commission Political Department Song and Dance Troupe, where he studied under Li Mengxiong, Yang Huatang and Shen Xiang. He joined the Communist Party of China in June 1979.

Career
In 1994 he sang the theme song of the 1994 historical television series Romance of the Three Kingdoms, adapted from Luo Guanzhong's classical novel of the same title.

In 1995 he sang a song titled "Sleepless Tonight" at the CCTV New Year's Gala.

Personal life
At the beginning of 1972, Yang met Liu Wenmei and married her half a year later. Their son, Yang Oujiang, was born on November 14, 1973.

References

1941 births
Male actors from Dalian
Living people
People's Liberation Army Academy of Art alumni
Chinese male singers
Singers from Liaoning
Musicians from Dalian